The Captain Anthony Meldahl Locks and Dam is a non-navigable river control dam with an associated lock, located at mile marker 436 on the Ohio River.  It was named for Captain Anthony Meldahl, a river captain.

The facility is operated by the United States Army Corps of Engineers.

A joint venture between Baker Concrete and Alberici Constructors built a three turbine hydroelectric plant and spillway addition to the Meldahl Locks and Dam With a generating capacity of 105 MW. The facility became fully operational in 2016.

See also
List of crossings of the Ohio River
List of locks and dams of the Ohio River

References

Buildings and structures in Bracken County, Kentucky
Bridges completed in 1964
Buildings and structures in Clermont County, Ohio
Dams in Kentucky
Dams in Ohio
Dams on the Ohio River
Transportation in Clermont County, Ohio
United States Army Corps of Engineers dams
Hydroelectric power plants in Kentucky
Transportation in Bracken County, Kentucky